Conus flamingo is a species of sea snail, a marine gastropod mollusk in the family Conidae, the cone snails, cone shells or cones.

These snails are predatory and venomous. They are capable of "stinging" humans.

Description
The size of the shell varies between 16 mm and 27 mm.

Distribution
Locus typicus: Off Dania, Broward County, Florida, USA.

This marine species of cone snail occurs off Eastern Florida at a depth of 46 m.

References

 Petuch, E. J. 1980a. A new species of Conus from southeastern Florida (Mollusca: Gastropoda). Proceedings of the Biological Society of Washington 93(20:299-302, 1 fig
 Puillandre N., Duda T.F., Meyer C., Olivera B.M. & Bouchet P. (2015). One, four or 100 genera? A new classification of the cone snails. Journal of Molluscan Studies. 81: 1-23

External links
 To World Register of Marine Species
 Cone Shells - Knights of the Sea
 Gastropods.com: Gradiconus flavescens flamingo (var.)

flamingo
Gastropods described in 1980